The Potterrow Mandela Centre or Potterrow Student Centre is operated by Edinburgh University Students' Association in Edinburgh, Scotland.

Site and architecture
The name "Potterrow" recalls a medieval suburb which stood outside the town walls. Its Victorian buildings and street layout disappeared when the university demolished the area for redevelopment in the mid-1960s. With its distinctive large Plexiglas dome, the building was designed by noted architects Morris and Steedman and completed in 1973. The centre was refurbished in 2012.

Use
Potterrow contains a variety of student entertainment and support services including a shop, a bank, two cafés, Edinburgh's largest nightclub, the university's Chaplaincy, The Advice Place and the main EUSA offices. In 1986, students voted to rename the centre in honour of imprisoned anti-apartheid revolutionary Nelson Mandela.

During the Edinburgh Festival Fringe in August, the building is used as a comedy venue under the name Pleasance Dome with five performing spaces, operated by the Pleasance Theatre Trust.

Gallery

References 

Buildings and structures of the University of Edinburgh
1973 establishments in Scotland
School buildings completed in 1973